Jail Bharo Tehreek is a protest movement launched by Pakistan Tehreek-e-Insaf (PTI) on 22 February 2023, aimed at countering what the party considers an attack on their fundamental rights and the economic meltdown.

The movement began in Lahore in February 2023 and involved peaceful and non-violent protests against what the party leader, Imran Khan, described as "sham FIRs and NAB cases, custodial torture, attacks on journalists and social media people," and economic failure brought on by a cabal of corrupt individuals who laundered billions in looted wealth.

The movement was intended to achieve true freedom for the people of Pakistan and included peaceful court arrests of party leaders and workers. The drive started in Lahore and moved to other cities, including Peshawar, Rawalpindi, Multan, Gujranwala, Sargodha, Sahiwal, and Faisalabad.

The Punjab government imposed Section 144 on the Mall Road, Gulberg main Boulevard, as well as outside the Punjab Civil Secretariat, and its adjoining roads to prohibit all types of assemblies, sit-ins, and processions. The movement was criticized by government who called it an attempt to create political instability in the country.

See also
 Jail Bharo Andolan
 Civil disobedience
 Nonviolent resistance

References

2023 in Pakistani politics
Pakistan Tehreek-e-Insaf
2023 protests
Protests in Pakistan